Matthew Robran (born 19 March 1971) is a former Australian rules footballer who represented  and  in the Australian Football League during the 1990s.

Robran was the first son of South Australian football legend Barrie Robran, and as a result he and his younger brother Jonathon, who also played AFL football, often faced unfair comparison with their father.

Statistics

|- style="background-color: #EAEAEA"
! scope="row" style="text-align:center" | 1991
|
| 25 || 7 || 5 || 7 || 55 || 44 || 99 || 29 || 6 || 9 || 0.7 || 1.0 || 7.9 || 6.3 || 14.1 || 4.1 || 0.9 || 1.3
|-
! scope="row" style="text-align:center" | 1993
|
| 5 || 9 || 7 || 4 || 66 || 62 || 128 || 42 || 9 || 32 || 0.8 || 0.4 || 7.3 || 6.9 || 14.2 || 4.7 || 1.0 || 3.6
|- style="background-color: #EAEAEA"
! scope="row" style="text-align:center" | 1994
|
| 5 || 0 || — || — || — || — || — || — || — || — || — || — || — || — || — || — || — || —
|-
! scope="row" style="text-align:center" | 1995
|
| 5 || 11 || 3 || 3 || 50 || 62 || 112 || 36 || 11 || 43 || 0.3 || 0.3 || 4.5 || 5.6 || 10.2 || 3.3 || 1.0 || 3.9
|- style="background-color: #EAEAEA"
! scope="row" style="text-align:center" | 1996
|
| 5 || 21 || 22 || 7 || 135 || 137 || 272 || 104 || 37 || 67 || 1.0 || 0.3 || 6.4 || 6.5 || 13.0 || 5.0 || 1.8 || 3.2
|-
! scope="row" style="text-align:center;" | 1997
|
| 10 || 19 || 24 || 14 || 150 || 89 || 239 || 95 || 35 || 28 || 1.3 || 0.7 || 7.9 || 4.7 || 12.6 || 5.0 || 1.8 || 1.5
|- style="background-color: #EAEAEA"
! scope="row" style="text-align:center;" | 1998
|
| 10 || 18 || 22 || 17 || 117 || 97 || 214 || 65 || 21 || 62 || 1.2 || 0.9 || 6.5 || 5.4 || 11.9 || 3.6 || 1.2 || 3.4
|-
! scope="row" style="text-align:center" | 1999
|
| 10 || 16 || 14 || 11 || 119 || 62 || 181 || 58 || 14 || 103 || 0.9 || 0.7 || 7.4 || 3.9 || 11.3 || 3.6 || 0.9 || 6.4
|- style="background-color: #EAEAEA"
! scope="row" style="text-align:center" | 2000
|
| 10 || 21 || 9 || 12 || 204 || 122 || 326 || 128 || 37 || 81 || 0.4 || 0.6 || 9.7 || 5.8 || 15.5 || 6.1 || 1.8 || 3.9
|-
! scope="row" style="text-align:center" | 2001
|
| 10 || 15 || 9 || 5 || 103 || 41 || 144 || 50 || 9 || 26 || 0.6 || 0.3 || 6.9 || 2.7 || 9.6 || 3.3 || 0.6 || 1.7
|- class="sortbottom"
! colspan=3| Career
! 137
! 115
! 80
! 999
! 716
! 1715
! 607
! 179
! 451
! 0.8
! 0.6
! 7.3
! 5.2
! 12.5
! 4.4
! 1.3
! 3.3
|}

References 

Adelaide Football Club players
Adelaide Football Club Premiership players
Hawthorn Football Club players
Norwood Football Club players
1971 births
Living people
South Australian State of Origin players
Australian rules footballers from South Australia
Two-time VFL/AFL Premiership players